The Winnipeg Freeze are a Manitoba Junior Hockey League (MJHL) team based in Winnipeg, Manitoba, Canada.  The team was founded in 2020 and is owned by 50 Below Sports + Entertainment Inc, owners of the Western Hockey League's Winnipeg Ice and another MJHL club, the Winnipeg Blues. During their abbreviated inaugural season, the Freeze played their home games at The Rink Training Centre in the Rural Municipality of Macdonald.  The Freeze then relocated to the Dakota Community Centre in the Winnipeg neighbourhood of St. Vital for the 2021–22 season. For the 2022-23 season, the team will play home games at hockey for all centre.

Season-by-season record
Note: GP = Games Played, W = Wins, L = Losses, T = Ties, OTL = Overtime Losses, GF = Goals for, GA = Goals against

Playoffs
2021 Playoffs cancelled
2022 DNQ

See also
List of ice hockey teams in Manitoba

References

External links
Winnipeg Freeze Official Website

Ice hockey teams in Winnipeg
Manitoba Junior Hockey League teams
Ice hockey clubs established in 2020
2020 establishments in Manitoba